Farrukh Ismayilov (born 30 August 1978) is a retired Azerbaijani footballer who played as a striker.

Ismayilov made 35 appearances for the Azerbaijan national football team from 1998 to 2007.

Career statistics

International goals

References

External links
 
 
 

1978 births
Living people
Association football forwards
Azerbaijani footballers
Azerbaijan international footballers
Azerbaijani expatriate footballers
Expatriate footballers in Ukraine
Azerbaijani expatriate sportspeople in Ukraine
Expatriate footballers in Iran
FC Volyn Lutsk players
Sanat Naft Abadan F.C. players
Ukrainian Premier League players
Gabala FC players